Thistle Island is an island on Fourth Lake in Herkimer County, New York. It is located east-northeast of Old Forge.

References

Islands of New York (state)
Islands of Herkimer County, New York